Hyndman is a Scottish surname.

Origins
The surname Hyndman has two origins. Second, it may have originated from a nickname, possibly  ("courteous") + . Variant spellings include Hindman. Early records of bearers of the surname include a Hector Hyndman of Renfewshire in the Exchequer Rolls of Scotland for 1553.

The Scottish Register of Tartans lists three tartans for families named Hyndman. Two are restricted tartans: one for the family of Captain Henry Hyndman (1785–1849), the son of an East India Company colonel who settled in Hong Kong; the other for the family of Daniel Hyndman in Edinburgh and Ontario. The third, created for C. P. Hyndman (stated to be "the first Hyndman to record arms in the Lyon Register since 1672"), has a design chosen to reflect his family's association with the Royal Inniskilling Fusiliers and the town of Paisley, and by C. P. Hyndman's wishes is available for all bearers of the surname born in Northern Ireland.

Statistics
The 1881 United Kingdom census found 338 bearers of the surname Hyndman, primarily in the west of Scotland. Statistics compiled by Patrick Hanks on the basis of the 2011 United Kingdom census and 2011 Ireland census showed 718 bearers of the surname on the island of Great Britain and 367 on the island of Ireland. In the United States, the 2010 Census found 1,054 people with the surname Hyndman, making it the 23,943rd-most-common surname in the country. This represented an increase from 1,038 (22,999th-most-common) in the 2000 Census. In both censuses, roughly nine-tenths of people with this surname identified as non-Hispanic White, and roughly six percent as non-Hispanic Black or African American.

People
 Abigail Hyndman (born 1990), British Virgin Islands beauty pageant titleholder
 Alex Hyndman (born 1978), British broadcast journalist
 Alicia Hyndman (born 1971), American education administrator and member of the New York State Assembly
 Alonzo Hyndman (1890–1940), Canadian physician and member of Parliament
 Bill Hyndman (1915–2001), American amateur golfer
 Catherine Hyndman (born 1990), Northern Irish footballer 
 Chris Hyndman (1966–2015), Canadian interior decorator and television personality
 Clint Hyndman, drummer for Australian band Something for Kate
 Emerson Hyndman (born 1996), American association football (soccer) player
 Frederick Walter Hyndman (1904–1995), Canadian insurance company executive and governor of Prince Edward Island
 George Crawford Hyndman (1796–1867), Irish auctioneer
 Harry Hyland Hyndman (1920–1963), Canadian politician, member of the Legislative Assembly of Ontario
 Henry Hyndman (1842–1921), English socialist theoretician
 James Hyndman (1874–1971), Canadian lawyer and justice of the Supreme Court of Alberta
 James Hyndman (actor) (born 1962), Canadian actor
 John Hyndman (1723–1762), Church of Scotland minister 
 Karine Gonthier-Hyndman (born 1984), Canadian actress from Quebec
 Kelley Hyndman (born 1985), American tennis player
 Lou Hyndman (1935–2013), Canadian lawyer and member of the Legislative Assembly of Alberta
 Mike Hyndman (born 1945), Canadian ice hockey player
 Peter Hyndman (1941–2006), Canadian lawyer and member of the British Columbia Legislative Assembly
 Rob J. Hyndman (born 1967), Australian statistician
 Robert Stewart Hyndman (1915–2009), Canadian painter
 Schellas Hyndman (born 1951), American association football (soccer) coach
 William Hyndman (baseball) (1854–1920), American baseball player

References